p21 activated kinases (PAKs) are members of a family of enzymes. They serve as targets for the small GTP binding proteins CDC42 and Rac and have been implicated in a wide range of biological activities.

Members include:
 PAK1, regulating cell motility and morphology
 PAK2, possibly playing a role in apoptosis
 PAK3, possibly for dendritic development and for the rapid cytoskeletal reorganization in dendritic spines associated with synaptic plasticity
 PAK4, a mediator of filopodia formation
 PAK5, a mediator of filopodia formation
 PAK6, involved in cytoskeleton rearrangement

References

External links
PAK Info with links in the Cell Migration Gateway 

Human proteins